Nottage Ridge is a ridge to the north of Mount Peleus that separates Baumann Valley and Sanford Valley in the east part of Olympus Range, Victoria Land. Named by Advisory Committee on Antarctic Names (US-ACAN) (1997) after George W. (Billy) Nottage, topographic engineer, a member of the 1971-72 United States Geological Survey (USGS) field party that established a network of horizontal and vertical control in support of compilation of topographic maps at the scale of 1:50,000 of areas of McMurdo Dry Valleys bounded by 160° and 164°E and 77°15' and 77°45'S.

Ridges of Victoria Land
McMurdo Dry Valleys